Klaus Heine is a lecturer in luxury marketing, luxury brand management, brand personality and brand identity at the Emlyon Business School and works as an independent consultant specializing in luxury brand management.

Biography 
Klaus Heine studied Business Administration with a focus on marketing and human resources at Technical University of Berlin (TUB) and Macquarie University in Sydney. He wrote his Master thesis at ThyssenKrupp Asia/Pacific in Shanghai about the marketing of European product innovations in China and his doctoral dissertation at TUB about the identity of luxury brands. He is currently working as a researcher and lecturer at the chair of marketing at TUB and as an independent [consultant] specializing in luxury brand management.

He conducted qualitative and quantitative luxury consumer surveys in Europe and on-site in China and published his research results in scientific and business conferences and international journals. His research initiated a broad press coverage in Germany with articles for instance in Die Zeit, Handelsblatt, Focus, Manager Magazin, and Süddeutsche Zeitung. Dr. Heine worked for the consulting company trommsdorff + drüner, which is affiliated with the marketing chair, and also on various independent consulting projects, which includes, amongst others, the Luxury Institute New York and Mont Charles de Monaco.

Publications 
 Heine, K. (2012), Die Identität von Luxusmarken, In: The Luxury Business Report, 30 March 2012
 Heine, K. (2011) [www.worldluxurybranddirectory.com The World Luxury Brand Directory], Technische Universität Berlin
 Heine, K. (2009) Is Berlin Luxury the Future Luxury? Presented at the International Herald Tribune Techno Luxury Conference, Berlin, 16–18 November.
 Heine, K. (2009) The Impact of the Luxury Brand Identity on Packaging Design. Presented at the LuxePack Conference, Monaco, 20–22 October.
 Heine, Klaus: The Concept of Luxury Brands. Luxury Brand Management, No. 1, 
 Heine, K. (2012) The Identity of Luxury Brands, luxury marketing, Technische Universität Berlin 
 Phan, M., Thomas, R., Heine, K. (2011) Luxury Brand Revitalization through Social Media, Presented at the KAMS Fall Conference, Seoul, 19 November.
 Phan, M., Thomas, R., Heine, K. (2011) Social Media and Luxury Brand Management: The Case of Burberry. In: Journal of Global Fashion Marketing, Vol. 2, Issue 4, pp. 213–222.
 Heine, K., Phan, M. (2011) Trading-Up Mass-Market Goods to Luxury Products. In: Australasian Marketing Journal, Vol. 19, Issue 2, pp. 108–114.
 Heine, K., Kübrich, K., Phan, M. (2010) The Definition of Luxury Products by their Constitutive Characteristics. Presented at the KAMS Fall Conference, Seoul, 27 November.
 Heine, K. (2010) Identification and Motivation of Participants for Luxury Consumer Surveys by Viral Participant Acquisition. In: The Electronic Journal of Business Research  Methods, Vol. 8, Issue 2, pp. 132–145
 Heine, K. (2010) Luxury & Sustainability: Implications of a Consumer-oriented Concept of Luxury Brands. Presented at the ITU-TUB Joint Conference, Istanbul, 10–12 November.
 Heine, K. (2010) The Personality of Luxury Fashion Brands. Journal of Global Fashion Marketing, Vol. 1, Issue 3, pp. 154–163.
 Heine, K., Trommsdorff, V. (2010) Dimensions of the Luxury Brand Personality. Proceedings of the Global Marketing Conference, Tokyo, 9–12 September, pp. 453–465.
 Heine, K., Trommsdorff, V. (2010) The Universe of Luxury Brand Personality Traits. Presented at the Global Marketing Conference, Tokyo, 9–12 September, p. 439.
 Heine, K. (2010) A Theory-based and Consumer-oriented Concept of Luxury Brands. Presented at the In Pursuit of Luxury Conference, London, 18 June.
 Heine, K. (2010) Identification and Motivation of Participants for Luxury Consumer Surveys. Proceedings of the 9th European Conference on Research Methodology for Business and Management Studies, Madrid, 24–25 June, pp. 183–193.
 Heine, K. (2010) The Luxury Brand Personality Traits. Proceedings of the 6th Thought Leaders International Conference in Brand Management, Lugano, 18–20 April.
 Heine, K., Trommsdorff, V. (2010) Practicable Value-Cascade Positioning of Luxury Fashion Brands. Proceedings of the 9th International Marketing Trends Conference, Venice, 21–23 January
 Heine, K. (2009) Using Personal and Online Repertory Grid Methods for the Development of a Luxury Brand Personality. In: The Electronic Journal of Business Research Methods, Vol. 7, Issue 1, pp. 25–38
 Heine, K. (2009) Using Personal and Online Repertory Grid Methods for the Development of a Luxury Brand Personality. Proceedings of the 8th European Conference on Research Methodology for Business and Management Studies, Valletta, Malta, 22–23 June, pp. 160–170.

External links 
 
 The "Concept of Luxury Brands" 

20th-century German people
Living people
Market researchers
Marketing theorists
Macquarie University alumni
Academic staff of Emlyon Business School
Technical University of Berlin alumni
Year of birth missing (living people)